Seacat may refer to:

 Seacat missile, a short-range surface-to-air missile system
 SeaCat (1992–2004), ferry company formerly operating from between Northern Ireland, Scotland and England
 The Sea-Cat, an imaginary monster from Flann O'Brien's novel An Béal Bocht
 Atlantic wolffish
 Sandra Seacat (born 1936), American actress and acting coach